Gordon Richards may refer to:

 Gordon Richards (jockey) (1904–1986), English jockey
 Gordon Richards (actor) (1893–1964), English actor
 Gordon Richards (astronomer) (born 1972), an American astronomer
 Gordon Richards (footballer), (1933–1993), a Welsh footballer
 Gordon W. Richards (1930–1998), a British racehorse trainer

See also 
 Asteroid 166747 Gordonrichards, named after the astronomer